Private August Dorley (also August Doerle) (1842 – October 17, 1867) was a German soldier who fought in the American Civil War. Dorley received the United States' highest award for bravery during combat, the Medal of Honor, for his action at Mount Pleasant, Alabama on 11 April 1865.

Biography
Dorley was born in Germany in 1842. He enlisted into the 1st Louisiana Cavalry. He died on 17 October 1867 and his remains are interred at the Natchez City Cemetery  in Natchez, Mississippi.

Medal of Honor citation

See also

List of American Civil War Medal of Honor recipients: A–F

References

1842 births
1867 deaths
German-born Medal of Honor recipients
German emigrants to the United States
People of Louisiana in the American Civil War
Union Army officers
United States Army Medal of Honor recipients
American Civil War recipients of the Medal of Honor